The Mesgi'g Ugju's'n (MU) Wind Farm,  "big wind" in Mi'gmaq  is a 149.25 megawatt (MW) wind farm currently under construction in eastern Quebec, Canada. The MU wind farm is expected to produce enough electricity to power approximately 30,000 homes. The wind project is owned and developed in a 50-50 partnership between the three Mi’gmaq First Nations (Listuguj, Gesgapegiag, Gespeg) and Innergex Renewable Energy.

The wind farm became operational in 2017.

See also

List of wind farms in Canada

References

External links
Project website
Interactive map of wind farms in Quebec

Wind farms in Quebec